Muhammad Bashir Khan is a Pakistani politician who had been a member of the National Assembly of Pakistan from August 2018 till January 2023.

Early life
He was born at Gambir village, Lower Dir.

Political career
He was elected to the National Assembly of Pakistan as a candidate of Pakistan Tehreek-e-Insaf (PTI) from Constituency NA-7 (Lower Dir-II) in 2018 Pakistani general election. He received 63,017 votes and defeated Siraj ul Haq. He has served as Federal parliamentary secretary for the ministry of privatisation. He has been a member of Pakistan Tehreek-e-Insaf since 1996

References

Living people
Pakistani MNAs 2018–2023
Pakistan Tehreek-e-Insaf MNAs
Year of birth missing (living people)